Bleusea is a genus of beetles in the family Carabidae, containing the following species:

 Bleusea ammophila Tschitscherine, 1898
 Bleusea deserticola Bedel, 1897

References

Harpalinae